The M1879 Reichsrevolver, or Reichs-Commissions-Revolver Modell 1879 and 1883, were service revolvers used by the German Army from 1879 to 1908, when it was superseded by the Luger.

The two versions of the revolver differ in barrel length (The M1883 had a 5-inch barrel) and grip shape. Although the design was dated, the weapon was extremely robust, and they were still used through World War I. The M1879 is referred to as the "cavalry model" and the M1883 as the "officer's model," by collectors, which were not official designations.

Design
Both models were single-action, solid frame, non-ejecting six-shot revolvers. The caliber was an indigenous 10.6×25mmR with a medium-length cartridge case, comparable to the contemporary .44 Russian round in size and power. Loading was via a gate on the revolver's right side, and the cylinder was released by pulling the hammer to half-cock. Removing empty cartridges could be done by removing the cylinder by withdrawing the axis pin, and then removing the casings by hand, but in actual practice a separate small rod (stored in the ammunition pouch) was used to push the casings out without having to remove the cylinder. A unique feature among these revolvers was the safety lever, which was often applied with the hammer resting in the half-cock position.

Most revolvers came with a lanyard ring for attachment to the uniform.

References
 Military Small Arms of the Twentieth Century, 7th Edition, Weeks, John, Hogg, Ian V.

See also

 Mauser Zig-Zag

1879 establishments in Germany
Revolvers of Germany
World War I German infantry weapons
Early revolvers
Military revolvers
Revolvers
Single-action revolvers